Madeleine Rebérioux (8 September 1920, Chambéry, Savoie – 7 February 2005, Paris) was a French historian whose specialty was the French Third Republic. She is also a historian of the Labour movement.

Life 
She was a professor at Paris-VIII, and School for Advanced Studies in the Social Sciences.

From 1981 to 1988, she was Vice-president of the Musée d'Orsay in Paris. 
From 1991 to 1995 she was President of the Ligue des droits de l'homme and had been a signatory to the Manifesto of the 121. 

She was an officer of the Légion d'honneur. Madeleine was  an active board member of Le Mouvement Social and later became its editor. 

Madeleine was against the war in Vietnam. She was president of French league of human rights - la Ligue des droits de l'homme - from 1991 to 1995.

Selected works 
 Jaurès : contre la guerre et la politique coloniale, Éditions Sociales, collection Les classiques du peuple, 1959.
 La Deuxième Internationale et l'Orient, Éditions Cujas, 1967 .
 Jaurès et la Classe ouvrière, Maspero, 1975.
 La République radicale ? 1898-1914, Nouvelle histoire de la France contemporaine, tome 11, Éditions du Seuil, coll. Points, 1975 .
 Les Ouvriers du livre et leur Fédération, Temps Actuel, 1981.
 Ils ont pensé les droits de l'homme, EDI-Ligue des droits de l'homme, 1989.
 Jaurès : la parole et l'acte, Gallimard, coll. « Découvertes Gallimard / Histoire » , 1994 .
 Fourmies et les Premier mai, Fourmies Colloquium 1891/1991 (1991), Éditions de l'Atelier, 1994, 
 Parcours engagés dans la France contemporaine, Belin, 1999.
 Vive la République ! Histoire, droits et combats de 1789 à la guerre d'Algérie, Démopolis, 2009 (recueil d'articles).

References 

1920 births
2005 deaths
Writers from Chambéry
20th-century French historians